The Church of One Tree is a historic building in the city of Santa Rosa, California, United States. It was built in 1873/4 from a single redwood tree milled in Guerneville, California (also known as Stumptown).

The single tree, when milled, produced 78,000 board feet of lumber, with the lumber costing a total of $3,000.
It was the original home to the First Baptist Church of Santa Rosa, located in downtown on B Street. It was moved to its current location to avoid destruction. The building has been home to several other unique uses in more recent decades. Robert Ripley, a native of Santa Rosa, wrote about the Church of One Tree — where his mother attended services, — as one of his earliest installments of “Believe It or Not!” In 1970, the Church of One Tree was repurposed as the Ripley Memorial Museum which was stocked with curiosities and “Believe it or Not!” memorabilia for nearly two decades.
From the 1950s until 1998 it was the Ripley Memorial Museum. Starting in 2008 and continuing through 2009, the City of Santa Rosa utilized grant funding to re-lead the stained glass windows, as well as repair, paint and renovate the interior of the Church, and the Recreation and Parks Department rents out the space for events. It is located adjacent to Juilliard Park and less than one block from the Luther Burbank Home and Gardens historic site.

References 

Wooden houses in the United States
Churches in Sonoma County, California
Buildings and structures in Santa Rosa, California
Wooden churches in California
Houses in Santa Rosa, California